Brington is a civil parish in West Northamptonshire in England. At the time of the 2001 census, the parish population was 482 people, increasing to 496 at the 2011 census.

It contains three villages:
Great Brington
Little Brington
Nobottle

The name 'Brington' means 'Farm/settlement connected with Bryni'.

History
In the time of William the Conqueror, Brington appears as the manor of Brinintone within the Hundred of Nobottle, one of many possessions of William Peverel.

Notable people
 Thomas Bache (died 1410),  originally from Genoa, an eminent judge and statesman in medieval Ireland, became vicar of Brington in 1378.
 Rev. Henry Holmes Stewart  (1847–1937), who won the FA Cup with Wanderers in 1873, was rector at the parish church from 1878 to 1898.

References

Civil parishes in Northamptonshire
West Northamptonshire District
The Bringtons Services and business